Tortured is a 2008 American crime thriller film written and directed by Nolan Lebovitz and starring Cole Hauser, Laurence Fishburne, and James Cromwell.  It was released direct-to-DVD in the U.S. on September 16, 2008. It was filmed in Vancouver, Canada.

Plot
FBI agent Kevin Cole goes undercover as Jimmy Vaughn, an organized crime enforcer. When he is ordered to undertake the week-long torture of accountant Archie Green, Kevin begins to question his role in government service, where often he must hurt or end another human being's life just to make a bust.

Cast
Cole Hauser as Agent Kevin Cole/Jimmy Vaughn
Laurence Fishburne as Archie Green
James Cromwell as Jack Cole
Emmanuelle Chriqui as Becky
Jon Cryer as Agent Brian Mark
Kevin Pollak as FBI Psychiatrist
James Denton as Murphy
Paul Perri as Emmet Gnoww
Robert LaSardo as Mo
Patrick Sabongui as Coffee Shop Manager
Ziggy as Voice of Ziggy

Reception
Tortured received mixed to negative reviews from critics. Andrew L. Urban praised the actor's performances and the film's production value however drew attention to poor writing saying, "the writing tries so hard to make a mysterious web of deceit that it ends up tying itself in knots." David Nusair gave the film a score of 1.5 out of 4 calling it a "well-intentioned yet undeniable misfire."

References

External links

2008 direct-to-video films
2008 crime thriller films
2008 films
American crime thriller films
Torture in films
2000s English-language films
2000s American films